Bumba is a genus of tarantula native to the Americas. It is an uncommon genus, comprising eight known species, including one named after John Lennon. Like most related species in the subfamily Theraphosinae, they may flick urticating hairs in response to threats.

Diagnosis 
They can be distinguished by the type 5 urticating hairs, and the palpal bulb resting in a "ventral distal excavation" of the pedipalp's tibia. The metatarsus number 1 passes between two branches of the tibial apophysis when flexed and the presence of spine like hairs on the maxillae and coxae 1 through 4.

Taxonomy
The genus was first described in 2000 by Fernando Pérez-Miles under the name Iracema; however this name was already in use for a genus of freshwater fish, so in 2005, Pérez-Miles proposed the replacement name Maraca. However, this too was already in use (for a species of cockroach) and in 2014 the replacement name Bumba was put forward by Pérez-Miles, Bonaldo & Miglio.

Etymology 
The genus name, Bumba, refers to Brazilian folk theater; in the Northern Brazilian region where the spiders are found, there is a festival called Boi-bumbá, or "beat my bull".

Species 
, the World Spider Catalog accepted the following 8 species:

Bumba cuiaba Lucas, Passanha & Brescovit, 2020 — Brazil
Bumba horrida (Schmidt, 1994) — Venezuela, Brazil
Bumba humilis (Vellard, 1924) — Brazil
Bumba lennoni Pérez-Miles, Bonaldo & Miglio, 2014 — Brazil
Bumba mineiros Lucas, Passanha & Brescovit, 2020 — Brazil, Paraguay
Bumba paunaka Ferretti, 2021 — Bolivia
Bumba rondonia Lucas, Passanha & Brescovit, 2020 — Brazil
Bumba tapajos Lucas, Passanha & Brescovit, 2020 — Brazil

In synonymy 

 Bumba cabocla (Pérez-Miles, 2000) = Bumba horrida

Transferred to other genera 

 Bumba pulcherrimaklaasi (Schmidt, 1991) → Cyclosternum pulcherrimaklaasi (Nomen dubium)

References

Theraphosidae
Theraphosidae genera
Spiders of South America